The Middlewood Way is an 11-mile (16 km) shared use path in north-west England, between Macclesfield and Rose Hill, Marple; it was opened on 30 May 1985 by Dr David Bellamy. It serves the needs of walkers, dog walkers, cyclists, joggers and horse riders and plays host to a wide range of flora and fauna.

Railway history
The Middlewood Way follows the route of the former Macclesfield, Bollington and Marple railway, which had operated between 1869 and 1970. This section of railway connected Macclesfield and Rose Hill Marple, with trains continuing on to Manchester Piccadilly.

Initially, there were five stations on the line: Marple (Rose Hill), High Lane, Higher Poynton, Bollington and Macclesfield. In 1879, a new station was opened at Middlewood; it was later renamed Middlewood Higher where the line crossed over Middlewood Lower station on the Buxton line.

On 5 January 1970, the section between Rose Hill Marple and Macclesfield closed to all traffic; the track was lifted in early 1971. Only Rose Hill Marple station remained in operation,  due to the high number of passengers commuting to Manchester Piccadilly; the station is now a single-tracked terminus for a spur off the Hope Valley Line.

Route
The path runs approximately parallel to the Macclesfield Canal and passes through Bollington and Higher Poynton. It can be reached by rail at Macclesfield, Middlewood, Rose Hill Marple and Romiley, via the Goyt Valley Connect 2 scheme.

The trail forms part of National Cycle Network Route 55 from Ironbridge to Preston.

Gallery

See also
Recreational walks in Cheshire

References

External links

Discovercheshire website (Middlewood Way page)
Guide to Middlewood Way cycle path with photos of current route

Footpaths in Cheshire
Geography of the Metropolitan Borough of Stockport
Macclesfield
Cycleways in England
Rail trails in England
Marple, Greater Manchester